The term population reduction may refer to:
 Population decline or depopulation, reductions in human population levels for reasons such as low birth rate, emigration, disease or war
 a euphemism for genocide, sometimes used by perpetrators of genocide to disguise their actions
 Population control, artificially maintaining the size of any population
 Culling, deliberate reductions in animal or plant population levels, by human action
 the phase preceding the extinction of a species